Biette Cassinel (c.1320s-1394) was the supposed royal mistress of Charles V of France from 1360 until 1363.

Biette was the daughter of the François Cassinel, sergent d'armes of John II of France, and Alix Deschamps. She was the sister of Ferry Cassinel, bishop of Lodève and Auxerre and eventually archbishop of Rheims.  

Biette was married to Gérard de Montagu by 1336. She was the mother of Jean de Montagu, who would rise to become Grand Master of France.  It is said by some that Jean was her son by Charles V, while Merlet and Delachenal state there is no evidence for this. Autrand states that a clerk of Parlement skipped two words, concerning Jean's execution, which incorrectly attributed Charles V as Jean's father, instead of his legitimate father Gerard de Montaigu.

Notes

References

Sources

Mistresses of French royalty
1325 births
1394 deaths